Gaudibert is a lunar impact crater that lies along the northeast edge of Mare Nectaris in the eastern part of the Moon's near side. Just to the east is the Montes Pyrenaeus mountain chain, and to the northeast beyond the mountains is the crater Gutenberg. Northwest of Gaudibert is the crater pair Isidorus and Capella.

This crater has a low rim and an irregular interior that makes it a relatively inconspicuous formation. The rim is roughly circular but somewhat uneven in outline. On the inner floor are several ridges that divide up the interior into several minor peaks and valleys. A pair of tiny, bowl-shaped craters are attached to the southern edge of the crater rim.

To the south of Gaudibert is a formation of several ghost craters, of which the most notable are Gaudibert A and Gaudibert B. These are best viewed when the sun is at a low angle, resulting in greater contrast and shadows.

External links
 Lunar Photo of the Day, "Land of Manna", October 5, 2006, showing Gaudibert and a similar nearby crater, Censorius C

Satellite craters
By convention these features are identified on lunar maps by placing the letter on the side of the crater midpoint that is closest to Gaudibert.

References

 
 
 
 
 
 
 
 
 
 
 
 

Impact craters on the Moon